Enciclopedia Universal Micronet is a digital encyclopedia in Spanish language created in 1995. The 2010 version contains more than 185,000 articles.

References

External links 
 micronet.es

Spanish encyclopedias
20th-century encyclopedias
21st-century encyclopedias